The Rage Against the Machine reunion tour was a concert tour by American rock band Rage Against the Machine that took place from 2007 to 2011. It was the first tour for the band since they broke up in 2000. This tour saw Rage Against the Machine performing live worldwide sporadically for four years, with the exception of 2009, before going back on hiatus; the band would not tour again until 2022.

History 
Rumors that Rage Against the Machine could reunite at the Coachella Valley Music and Arts Festival were circulating in mid-January 2007, and were confirmed on January 22. The band was confirmed to be headlining the final day of Coachella 2007. The reunion was described by Morello as primarily being a vehicle to voice the band's opposition to the "right-wing purgatory" the United States has "slid into" under the George W. Bush administration since RATM's dissolution.

On April 14, 2007, Morello and de la Rocha reunited onstage early to perform a brief acoustic set at a Coalition of Immokalee Workers rally in downtown Chicago. Morello described the event as "very exciting for everybody in the room, myself included." This was followed by the scheduled Coachella performance on Sunday, April 29 where the band staged a much anticipated performance to the largest crowds of the festival.
This was originally thought of as a one-off show, which later turned out to be untrue. The band later played four shows in the Hip Hop festival Rock the Bells with the Wu Tang Clan, Public Enemy and Cypress Hill, and later an additional night in New York City after the first night sold out in 20 minutes. Rage also played their first (non-festival) concert in seven years at the Alpine Valley Music Theater in East Troy, Wisconsin, supported by Queens of the Stone Age in August 2007.
The band played co-headlining spots at New Orleans' Voodoo Music Experience in late October and the Vegoose Festival in Las Vegas. These shows were the last performances by the band in 2007.

On January 18, 2008, the band played their first show outside of the U.S. since their reunion in Auckland, New Zealand, as part of the Big Day Out festival series. The band also played seven shows in Australia including several headlining shows in Melbourne, Sydney, Adelaide, and Perth. The band has since continued to tour around the world, headlining many large festivals in Europe and the United States, including Lollapalooza in Chicago, Illinois. In 2008 the band also played shows in Denver, Colorado and St. Paul, Minnesota; the locations of the Democratic National Convention and Republican National Convention, respectively.

In December 2008, PremierGuitar.com conducted an interview with Tom Morello and when asked about his plans for 2009 he replied:

"Well, I know for sure that I'll be doing a lot of Nightwatchman dates in the coming year and continuing the Axis of Justice organization that I run with Serj Tankian. I got a pretty large cache of Nightwatchman songs that I haven't released yet so I'll definitely continue writing and recording. Also, I had a great time playing Rage Against the Machine shows over the course of the year and half and I have no doubt that we'll continue to do more of those in the future."

In 2009, Morello also went on to work with his nonprofit, Axis of Justice.

Another leg was added for Europe in 2010. The leg included dates at indoor arenas, and outdoor festivals. The band also headlined the Download Festival at Donington Park, on June 12. On July 23, Rage performed at a benefit concert at the Hollywood Palladium theater in their hometown of Los Angeles to protest against the Arizona SB 1070 law. It was their first U.S. show in two years and according to guitarist Tom Morello it will be their only show in the U.S. for the year. In late 2010 they also completed a short three-date South American tour, including a headline set at the SWU Music & Arts Festival. This was the first time they had played in that continent.

Morello stated, the only Rage appearance for 2011 was a performance on July 30 at the L.A. Rising festival with El Gran Silencio, Immortal Technique, Lauryn Hill, Rise Against and Muse. Morello hoped that Rage Against the Machine would tour in 2012 to commemorate the 20th anniversary of their self-titled debut album, but this never came to fruition.

On July 30, 2013, exactly two years after its original performance, it was announced on the L.A. Rising's Facebook page that the festival would once again take place in August 2014. Multiple sources reported that Rage Against the Machine would participate in the festival. However, this never happened.

On October 16, 2015, the 2010 gig in Finsbury Park was released as a DVD and Blu-ray titled Live at Finsbury Park.

Setlist 
Throughout the entirety of the reunion tour, the band's setlist was usually of the same structure for every show. The band played various songs at different shows. On each leg of the tour, the band played a new song(s) and added them regularly to the setlist. At a regular performance, the band would play 14 or 15 songs, including an encore.

Songs played 

Testify
Bulls on Parade
People of the Sun
Bombtrack
Know Your Enemy
Bullet in the Head
Born of a Broken Man
Clampdown (The Clash cover)
Vietnow
Without a Face (played once in Portugal)
Down Rodeo
Kick Out the Jams (played original MC5 version with Wayne Kramer)
Tire Me
Guerrilla Radio

White Riot (The Clash cover)
No Shelter (played once in San Bernardino)
Renegades of Funk
Ashes in the Fall
Take the Power Back (played once at Alpine Valley Music Theatre)
Calm Like a Bomb
Sleep Now in the Fire
War Within a Breath
Wake Up
Freedom (with Township Rebellion Snippet)
Killing in the Name
Year of tha Boomerang (played once at Rock im Park)
Katrina Song (played once at the Target Center in Minneapolis, MN)
Canción del minero (Víctor Jara cover) (played once in Chile)

Tour dates

References

External links 
 Official website
 Axis of Justice Tom Morello and Serj Tankian's activist website "Axis of Justice"

Rage Against the Machine concert tours
2007 concert tours
2008 concert tours
2010 concert tours
2011 concert tours
Reunion concert tours